Stephen H. Friend is co-founder and director of Sage Bionetworks.

Formerly Senior Vice-President at Merck & Co. Friend co-founded Rosetta Inpharmatics with Leland H. Hartwell and Leroy Hood in 1996. Much of his research has focused on cancer.

Friend has also held faculty positions at Harvard Medical School and at Massachusetts General Hospital. He received his Bachelor of Arts in philosophy, his Ph.D. in biochemistry and his M.D. from Indiana University.

Recognition
Friend is named an Ashoka Fellow by Ashoka: Innovators for the Public in 2011.

Selected bibliography

References

External links
TED talk with Stephen Friend

Living people
American scientists
Year of birth missing (living people)
Ashoka Fellows
Ashoka USA Fellows